Sri Sultan Hamengkubawono X (Hanacaraka: , also spelled as Hamengkubawana X, often abbreviated as HB X; born Bendara Raden Mas Herjuno Darpito, 2 April 1946) is the Sultan of the historic Yogyakarta Sultanate in Indonesia and is currently also the Governor of the modern Yogyakarta Special Region.

Hamengkubawono X succeeded his father, Hamengkubuwono IX as the Sultan of Yogyakarta when Hamengkubuwono IX died on 3 October 1988. Hamengkubuwono X was formally installed as Sultan on 7 March 1989. However, the position of the Governor of the Yogyakarta Special Region did not go to Hamengkubuwono X. Vice Governor Sri Paku Alam VIII, prince of the subordinate enclave of Paku Alaman within Yogyakarta was instead controversially elevated to the position of governor. This was contrary to the agreement made at the independence of Indonesia in recognition of Hamengkubuwono IX's support and role in the Indonesian War of Independence. Under the agreement, the Sultan holds the position of governor in the Yogyakarta Special Region, and the Paku Alam holds the position of vice governor.

On 30 August 2012, following a decade of talks between Yogyakarta and the central government, the national legislature of Indonesia formally enshrined in law the convention that the Sultan inherits the position of governor.

Background
Hamengkubuwono X was a graduate of Public Administration at the Faculty of Law of Gadjah Mada University in Yogyakarta. He was active as Chairman of Indonesian Chamber of Commerce and Industry of the Special Region of Yogyakarta, Chairman of the Sports Committee of the Special Region of Yogyakarta, chairman and managing director of PT Punokawan Construction, President of the PG Madukismo Commissioner, and in July 1996 was appointed Chairman of the Special Region of Yogyakarta Expert Counsel to the Governor.

Hamengkubuwono X followed the tradition of his late father Sri Sultan Hamengkubuwono IX in the spirit of Indonesian nationalism over self-interest by participating in street protests in support of the May 1998 student demonstrations opposing Suharto's rule, and like his illustrious father, wanted to be a pioneer in the Yogyakarta Reformation Movement albeit in a non-violent manner. He was also one of the four key figures in the early reform period that sparked the Ciganjur Declaration urging the government to hold elections as soon as possible, because President BJ Habibie had neither constitutional nor legal rights to take over the presidency of Suharto who had just resigned.

Hamengkubuwono X has stated his vision for his region and the Sultanate are the development of science and technology, development of agriculture, tourism and world-famous cultural industries and thus provide a fair and prosperous life to all his citizens. He was nominated by popular choice, to the Golkar Yogyakarta Assembly as a presidential candidate for the 2009 Indonesian presidential election campaign. Hamengkubuwono X, though widely respected across all parties and nationwide as neutral, honest and uncorrupted was ultimately unsuccessful in garnering support outside Central Java and was unsuccessful to attain a first-round voting position.

Personal life
Hamengkubuwono X has discontinued the polygamist tradition of Javanese monarchs having several wives and possibly multiple concubines, as per his late father's wishes to modernize the royal system. He is married to Queen Hemas. Together they have five daughters, Crown Princess Mangkubumi, Princess Condrokirono, Princess Maduretno, Princess Hayu, and Princess Bendoro. His decision to appoint his eldest daughter as heir presumptive, ended the previously agnatic primogeniture succession and has become subject to controversies.

Hamengkubuwono X resides in the Keraton Yogyakarta complex and uses the Governor's mansion solely for political affairs.

Family

Parents
Father — Sri Sultan Hamengkubuwono IX

Mother — Raden Ajeng Siti Kustina (Bandara Raden Ayu Widyaningrum/Kanjeng Raden Ayu Widyaningrum/Raden Ayu Adipati Anum)

Consort and Issue

 Queen Gusti Kanjeng Ratu Hemas (born Tatiek Drajad Suprihastuti, then Bandara Raden Ayu Mangkubumi; daughter of Colonel Raden Subanadigda Sastrapranata)
 Crown Princess Gusti Kanjeng Ratu Mangkubumi Hamemayu Hayuning Bawana Langgeng ing Mataram (born Gusti Raden Ajeng Nurmalita Sari, then Gusti Kanjeng Ratu Pembayun; 24 February 1972), married Kanjeng Pangeran Haryo Wironegoro on 28 May 2002 and have issue; one daughter and one son.
 Gusti Kanjeng Ratu Condrokirono (born Gusti Raden Ajeng Nurmagupita; 2 February 1975), married Kanjeng Raden Tumenggung Suryokusumo on December and divorced in 2007. They have one son.
 Gusti Kanjeng Ratu Maduretno (born Gusti Raden Ajeng Nurkamnari Dewi; 12 April 1978), married Kanjeng Pangeran Haryo Purbodiningrat on 9 May 2008
 Gusti Kanjeng Ratu Hayu (born Gusti Raden Ajeng Nurabra Juwita; 24 December 1983), married Kanjeng Pangeran Haryo Notonegoro on 22 October 2013 and have two sons.
 Gusti Kanjeng Ratu Bendoro (born Gusti Raden Ajeng Nurastuti Wijareni; 18 September 1986), married Kanjeng Pangeran Haryo Yudanegara on 18 October 2011 and have issue; one daughter and one son.

Siblings
 Gusti Bendara Pangeran Haryo Joyokusumo
 Gusti Bendara Pangeran Haryo Hadiwinoto
 Gusti Bendara Pangeran Haryo Prabukusuma
 Gusti Bendara Pangeran Haryo Yudhaningrat

Titles and honours

Titles 
In Javanese Kraton (palaces) names of individuals change with respect to change in status:
 From birth until marriage                          : Bendoro Raden Mas Herjuno Darpito
 Post-nuptial until appointment as Crown Prince : Kanjeng Gusti Pangeran Harya (KGPH) Mangkubumi
 As Heir Apparent Crown Prince                : Kanjeng Gusti Pangeran Adipati Anom (KGPAAn) Hamengku Negara Sudibya Raja Putra Nalendra Mataram.
 As Sultan                                          : Ngarsa Dalem Sampeyan Dalem Ingkang Sinuwun Kangjeng Sri Sultan Hamengku Buwono Senapati ing Ngalogo Ngabdurrokhman Sayidin Panatagama Khalifatullah ingkang jumeneng kaping X

His style and title in full English                  : His Majesty The Sultan Hamengkubuwono the Tenth, Commander-in-chief in war, Servant of the Most Gracious, Cleric and Caliph that Safeguards the Religion

Honours 
: Order of the Rising Sun, Gold and Silver Star (2022)

See also

List of Sunni Muslim dynasties
Kejawèn religion

References

External links
YogYes Official Yogyakarta Tourism website
Official Website for Sri Sultan Hamengkubuwono X
AsiaWeek - The sultan of Yogyakarta is a modern reformer
In Indonesian 

1946 births
Living people
People from Yogyakarta
Sultans of Yogyakarta
Governors of Yogyakarta
Gadjah Mada University alumni
Golkar politicians
Indonesian royalty
Javanese people